Nitrofen is an herbicide of the diphenyl ether class.  Because of concerns about its carcinogenicity, the use of nitrofen has been banned in the European Union and in the United States since 1996. It has been superseded by related protoporphyrinogen oxidase enzyme inhibitors including acifluorfen and fomesafen.

In 2002, Nitrofen was detected in organic feed, organic eggs, and organic poultry products in Germany prompting a scandal which caused a decline in all organic meat sales in Europe.

Nitrofen is listed as an IARC Group 2B carcinogen, meaning it is "possibly carcinogenic to humans".

References

External links 
 

Herbicides
Phenol ethers
Nitro compounds
Chloroarenes
IARC Group 2B carcinogens